Oskar Köster (20 December 1890 in Pöide – 2 August 1941 Tallinn) was an Estonian politician.

In 1926, he founded the newspaper Maa and was its chief editor. Köster was arrested by the NKVD on 22 July 1940 in Tallinn. He died of a heart attack in Patarei Prison; according to other reports he was executed.

Political offices:
 Mayor of Rägavere Parish
 1926–1928 and 1932 Minister of Agriculture 
 1928–1929 and 1933 Minister of Communications
 1929–1931 Minister of Defence

References

1890 births
1941 deaths
People from Saaremaa Parish
People from Kreis Ösel
Settlers' Party politicians
Agriculture ministers of Estonia
Government ministers of Estonia
Members of the Riigikogu, 1923–1926
Members of the Riigikogu, 1926–1929
Members of the Riigikogu, 1929–1932
Members of the Riigikogu, 1932–1934
Members of the Riigivolikogu
Mayors of places in Estonia
Estonian editors
Estonian military personnel of the Estonian War of Independence
Recipients of the Cross of Liberty (Estonia)
Estonian people who died in prison custody
Estonian people who died in Soviet detention